Fahrdorf is a municipality in the district of Schleswig-Flensburg, in Schleswig-Holstein, Germany. It takes its name from the ferry that once crossed the Schlei here and today is shown in the town's coat of arms. Fahrdorf lies at the Bundesstraße 76 between the cities of Schleswig and Eckernförde. West of Fahrdorf lies the ancient Viking settlement of Hedeby.

1970 familicide
On 20 April 1970, 44-year-old Harry Kecinski shot his wife and seven children before he turned the gun on himself. The motive for the familicide appeared to be the Schleswig-Holstein tax office, where Harry worked until he was fired on 7 April. In a farewell letter, Kecinski wrote of economic difficulties and his hopeless situation. He acted with the consent of his wife.

References

Municipalities in Schleswig-Holstein
Schleswig-Flensburg